Louis-Mathias Auger (April 3, 1902 – March 6, 1966) was an Ontario teacher and political figure. He represented Prescott in the House of Commons of Canada as a Liberal member from 1926 to 1929.
He was born in Contrecoeur, Quebec in 1902, the son of Louis Auger, and moved to Hawkesbury, Ontario with his family in 1912. Auger had studied at the University of Ottawa and went on to teach there. He defeated Gustave Évanturel to win a seat in the House of Commons in 1926. During his term in office, he was articling with a lawyer in L'Original and studying law part-time at Osgoode Hall. He resigned his seat in 1929 after being accused of raping a young woman from his constituency who had come to see him in the House of Commons about possible employment in the public service. Auger was finally acquitted of the charge of rape but found guilty of seduction and was sentenced to two years in Kingston Penitentiary, the maximum penalty for that crime, after five trials and two appeals over sixteen months.

He ran unsuccessfully as an independent Liberal in 1935. Auger served as mayor of Hawkesbury in 1936.

In 2006, Marguerite Andersen published a novel Doucement le bonheur (Gently happiness) based on the events surrounding the trial.

References

Histoire des Comtes Unis de Prescott et de Russell, L. Brault (1963)

External links
 
Calculated to Reflect on the Dignity of Parliament, C Backhouse
Lieux et monuments historiques du Nord de Montréal, R. Fournier (1978)

1902 births
1966 deaths
Liberal Party of Canada MPs
Members of the House of Commons of Canada from Ontario
Mayors of places in Ontario
Franco-Ontarian people
People from Hawkesbury, Ontario
Canadian politicians convicted of crimes
Canadian prisoners and detainees
Prisoners and detainees of Canada
People acquitted of rape